Sepa was a village in Pihtla Parish, Saare County in western Estonia.

During the administrative reform in 2017, the village was unified with Salavere village.

References 

Villages in Saare County